The Badarian culture provides the earliest direct evidence of agriculture in Upper Egypt during the Predynastic Era. It flourished between 4400 and 4000 BC, and might have already emerged by 5000 BC.

Location and excavation

Badari culture is so named because of its discovery at El-Badari, an area in the Asyut Governorate in Upper Egypt. The area stretches for  along the east bank of the Nile. Some Badarian sites also show evidence of later predynastic use.

It was first excavated by Guy Brunton and Gertrude Caton-Thompson between 1922 and 1931. About forty settlements and six hundred graves have been located.

Cultural features

The Badarian economy was based mostly on agriculture, fishing and animal husbandry. Populations in the Badari culture planted wheat, barley, lentils and tubers. Pits that have been found may have served as granaries. They kept cattle, sheep, and goats; their livestock, as well as dogs, were given ceremonial burial. They used boomerangs, fished from the Nile and hunted gazelle.

Little is known of their buildings, although remains of wooden stumps have been found at one site and may have been associated with a hut or shelter of unknown construction.

The deceased were wrapped in reed matting or animal skins and buried in pits with their heads usually laid to the south, looking west. This seems contiguous with the later dynastic traditions regarding the west as the land of the dead. They were sometimes accompanied by female mortuary figures carved from ivory, or with personal items such as shells, flint tools, amulets in the shape of animals like the antelope and hippopotamus, and jewelry made of ivory, quartz or copper. Green malachite ore has also been detected on stone palettes, perhaps for personal decoration. Tools included end-scrapers, axes, bifacial sickles and concave-base arrowheads. Social stratification has been inferred from the burying of more prosperous members of the community in a different part of the cemetery. Black-topped pottery has been discovered in these cemeteries. These works with their distinctive rippled pattern are considered the most characteristic element of the Badarian culture.

Trade
Basalt vases found at Badari sites were most likely traded up the river from the Delta region or from the northwest. Shells came in quantities from the Red Sea. Turquoise possibly came from Sinai. A Syrian connection is suggested for a four-handled pot of hard pink ware. The black pottery, with white incised designs, may have come directly from the West, or from the South. The porphyry slabs are like the later ones in Nubia, but the material could have come from the Red Sea Mountains. The glazed steatite beads were not made locally. These all suggest that the Badarians were not an isolated tribe, but were in contact with the cultures on all sides of them. Nor were they nomadic, having pots of such size and fragility that would have been unsuitable for use by wanderers.

Ancestral origins and biological anthropology

The Badarian culture seems to have had multiple sources, of which the Western Desert was probably the most influential. The Badari culture was likely not solely restricted to the Badari region, since related finds have been made farther to the south at Mahgar Dendera, Armant, Elkab and Nekhen (named Hierakonpolis by the Greeks), as well as to the east in the Wadi Hammamat. 

Older and modern scholarship have characterised the Badarians as an indigenous, African population that was rooted in a localised, context. Frank Yurco considered the Badarians as exhibiting a "mix of North African and Sub-Saharan physical traits" and referenced older, analysis of skeletal remains which "showed tropical African elements in the population of the earliest Badarian culture". Recent archaeological evidence has suggested that the Tasian and Badarian Nile Valley sites were a peripheral network of earlier African cultures that featured the movement of Badarian, Saharan, Nubian and Nilotic populations.

A 1993 craniofacial study performed by C. Loring Brace et al reached the view that "The Predynastic of Upper Egypt and the Late Dynastic of Lower Egypt are more closely related to each other than to any other population. As a whole, they show ties with the European Neolithic, North Africa, modern Europe, and, more remotely, India, but not at all with  sub-Saharan Africa, eastern Asia, Oceania, or the New  World."

In 2005, S.O.Y. Keita examined Badarian crania from predynastic upper Egypt in comparison to European (Norway and Hungary) and various tropical African crania (Southern Africa, Mali and Kenya). He found that the predynastic Badarian series clustered much closer with the tropical African series. Although, no West Asian or other North African samples were included in the original study as the comparative series were selected based on "Brace et al.'s (1993) comments on the affinities of an upper Egyptian/Nubian epipalaeolithic series". Keita further noted that "additional analysis using material from Sudan, late dynastic northern Egypt (Gizeh), Somalia, Asia and the Pacific Islands show the Badarian series to be most similar to a series from the northeast quadrant of Africa and then to other Africans". Moreover, Keita criticised the methodology of the 1993 Brace study for excluding "the Maghreb, Sudan, and the Horn of Africa" from the designated Sub-Saharan group samples which he argued was nearly categorised and "(incorrectly)" as monolithic". Keita further commented on the findings of Boyce that whilst the "post-Badarian southern predynastic and a late dynastic northern series (called "E" or Gizeh) cluster together, and secondarily with Europeans", in the primary cluster with Egyptian groups there were also remains representing populations from ancient Sudan and recent Somalia.

Joel Irish and Lyle Konigsberg (2007) re-examined the findings of a 1955 study in light of recent archaeological and dental morphological data. They stated that re-inspection of the craniometric samples "indicate a Badarian affiliation to North Africans, not sub-Saharan samples".

In 2007, Strouhal et al described the physical features of ancient A-Group Nubians as "Caucasoid" which were "not distinguishable from the contemporary Predynastic Upper Egyptians of the Badarian and Naqadian cultures" based in reference to previous anthropological studies from 1975 and 1985.

In 2011, Michelle Raxter examined the changes in limb proportions and body sizes in ancient Egyptians in a worldwide and regional comparative thesis study. The study featured 92 males and 528 female samples which included skeletal remains from the Badarian period. The Egyptian body sizes were compared with Nubian samples, as well as to modern Egyptian samples and other higher and lower latitude populations. Overall, the study found that "Ancient Egyptians have more tropically adapted limbs in comparison to body breadths, which tend to be intermediate when plotted against higher and lower latitude populations. These results may reflect the greater plasticity of limb lengths compared to body breadth. The results might also suggest early Mediterranean and/or Near Eastern influence in Northeast Africa". Raxter also acknowledged that a larger sample collection from the early and late predynastic groups would have enabled "closer examination of biological changes in the transition to agriculture".

Dental trait analysis of Badarian fossils conducted in a thesis study found that they were closely related to other Afroasiatic-speaking populations inhabiting Northeast Africa and the Maghreb. Among the ancient populations, the Badarians were nearest to other ancient Egyptians (Naqada, Hierakonpolis, Abydos and Kharga in Upper Egypt; Hawara in Lower Egypt), and C-Group and Pharaonic era skeletons excavated in Lower Nubia, followed by the A-Group culture bearers of Lower Nubia, the Kerma and Kush populations in Upper Nubia, the Meroitic, X-Group and Christian period inhabitants of Lower Nubia, and the Kellis population in the Dakhla Oasis. Among the recent groups, the Badari markers were morphologically closest to the Shawia and Kabyle Berber populations of Algeria as well as Bedouin groups in Morocco, Libya and Tunisia, followed by other Afroasiatic-speaking populations in the Horn of Africa. The Late Roman era Badarian skeletons from Kellis were also phenotypically distinct from those belonging to other populations in Sub-Saharan Africa.

Although, various biological anthropological studies have demonstrated strong biological affinities between the Badarians and other African populations. S.O.Y. Keita, a biological anthropologist, in 1990 conducted a craniometric analysis of pre-dynastic Badarian and Naqada skulls which found both series to "cluster with tropical Africans".

Sonia Zakrzewski (2003) found that samples from the Badarian to the Middle Kingdom in Upper Egypt had "tropical body plans" but that their proportions were actually "super-negroid", i.e. the limb indices are relatively longer than in many "African" populations. She proposed that the apparent development of an increasingly African body plan over time may also be due to Nubian mercenaries being included in the Middle Kingdom sample. Although, she noted that in spite of the differences in tibae lengths among the Badarian and Early Dynastic samples, that "all samples lie relatively clustered together as compared to the other populations". Zakrzewski concluded that the "results must remain provisional due to the relatively small sample sizes and the lack of skeletal material that cross-cuts all social and economic groups within each time period".

In 2008 Keita found that the early predynastic groups in Southern Egypt which included Badarian skeletal samples, were similar to Nile-Valley material from areas to the south and north of Upper Egypt. Overall, the dynastic Egyptians (includes both Upper and Lower Egyptians) showed much closer affinities with the included Northeast African populations than Europeans. In his comparison to the various Egyptian series, Greeks, Somali/Horn, and Italians were used. He also concluded that more material was needed to make a firm conclusion about the relationship between the early Holocene Nile valley populations and later ancient Egyptians.

Kanya Godde in a 2009 study evaluated population relationships by comparing cranial traits in twelve Nubian and Egyptian groups which included skeletal remains from the Badarian period. The results showed small biological distance between the groups, which indicate there may have been some sort of gene flow between these groups of Nubians and Egyptians or a common adaptation to similar environments. Godde further specified that the Badarians, Naqadans and Kerma Nubian samples clustered closely in spite of the timescale differences. She also cited previous anthropological studies and archaeological evidence which indicated close affinities between the Badarians and other southernly, African populations. In 2020, Godde analysed a series of crania which included two Egyptian (predynastic Badarian and Naqada series), a series of A-Group Nubians, and a Bronze Age series from Lachish, Palestine. The two pre-dynastic series had strongest affinities, followed by closeness between the Naqada and the Nubian series. Further, the Nubian A-Group plotted nearer to the Egyptians and the Lachish sample placed more closely to Naqada than Badari. According to Godde the spatial-temporal model applied to the pattern of biological distances explains the more distant relationship of Badari to Lachish than Naqada to Lachish as gene flow will cause populations to become more similar over time. Overall, both Egyptian samples were more similar to the Nubian series than to the Lachish series.

In 2023, Christopher Ehret reported that the physical anthropological findings from the “major burial sites of those founding locales of ancient Egypt in the fourth millennium BCE, notably El-Badari as well as Naqada, show no demographic indebtedness to the Levant”. Ehret specified that these studies revealed cranial and dental affinities with "closest parallels" to other longtime populations in the surrounding areas of northeastern Africa “such as Nubia and the northern Horn of Africa”. He further commented that the Naqada and Badarian populations did not migrate “from somewhere else but were descendants of the long-term inhabitants of these portions of Africa going back many millennia”.

Genetic data on the Badarian remains

Keita and Boyce (1996) noted that DNA studies had not been conducted on the southern predynastic Egyptian skeletons. Although, various DNA studies have found Christian-era and modern Nubians along with modern Afro-Asiatic speaking populations in the Horn of Africa to be descended from a mix of West Eurasian and African populations. Several scholars have highlighted a number of methodological limitations with the application of DNA studies to Egyptian mummified remains.

Relative chronology

See also
Merimde culture
Tasian culture

References

Sources

Petrie, Flinders. "34. The Badarian Civilisation." Man, vol. 26, 1926, pp. 64–64. JSTOR, http://www.jstor.org/stable/2787955. Accessed 2 Jun. 2022.
Guy Brunton and Gertrude Caton-Thompson: The Badarian Civilisation and Predynastic Remains near Badari, London: British School of Archaeology in Egypt, 1928.
Castillos, J. J. (1982). Analysis of Egyptian Predynastic and Early Dynastic Cemeteries. Final Conclusions. Journal (The) of the Society for the Study of Egyptian Antiquities, 12(1), 29-53.
Holmes, D. L. (1989). The Predynastic lithic industries of Upper Egypt/1. The Predynastic lithic industries of Upper Egypt a comparative study of the lithic traditions of Badari, Nagada and Hierakonpolis.
Friedman, R. F. (1994). Predynastic settlement ceramics of Upper Egypt: A comparative study of the ceramics of Hemamieh, Nagada, and Hierakonpolis (Doctoral dissertation, University of California, Berkeley).
Holmes, D., & Friedman, R. (1994). Survey and Test Excavations in the Badari Region, Egypt. Proceedings of the Prehistoric Society, 60(1), 105-142. doi:10.1017/S0079497X0000342X
Savage, S. (2001). Towards an AMS Radiocarbon Chronology of Predynastic Egyptian Ceramics. Radiocarbon, 43(3), 1255-1277. doi:10.1017/S0033822200038534

External links

 Badarian Art  Badarian figurines in the British Museum 
Badarian Government and Religious Evolution
The Journal of African History, published by the Cambridge University Press

 
Neolithic cultures of Africa
Predynastic Egypt
5th-millennium BC establishments
4th-millennium BC disestablishments
Archaeological cultures in Egypt
Upper Egypt